Yves Tarayre is a French former ice dancer. With Martine Olivier, he is the 1976 World Junior bronze medalist and 1979 French national champion. They trained in Châlons-en-Champagne. After their partnership ended, he competed with Géraldine Inghelaere.

Competitive highlights

With Olivier

Inghelaere

References 

French male ice dancers
Living people
People from Châlons-en-Champagne
World Junior Figure Skating Championships medalists
Sportspeople from Marne (department)
Year of birth missing (living people)